Brigida or Brígida may refer to:

Brígida Baltar (born 1959), Brazilian visual artist
Brigida Banti Giorgi (1757–1806), noted Italian soprano in the 18th and early 19th century
Brigida Haraldsdotter, medieval Swedish Queen consort, spouse of King Magnus (II) of Sweden
Santa Brígida, Las Palmas, Canarian municipality in the northeastern portion of the island of Gran Canaria
Santa Brigida (BG), comune in the Province of Bergamo in the Italian region of Lombardy

fr:Brigitte